KOLY (1300 AM) is a radio station licensed to serve Mobridge, South Dakota.  The station is owned by James River Broadcasting. It airs a full-service oldies-lean classic hits music format with extensive news, agricultural reports, sports, and Paul Harvey talk programming.

All three DRG Media Group (James River Broadcasting) stations in Mobridge share studios at 118 3rd St. East, in Mobridge. The KOLY AM and FM transmitters and the 581 foot tower are east of town, on Highway 12.

The station was assigned these call letters by the Federal Communications Commission.

Personalities
In 2006, sports director Pat Morrison celebrated 50 years on the air at KOLY-AM/FM as the voice of Mobridge High School.

References

External links
KOLY official website

OLY
Classic hits radio stations in the United States
News and talk radio stations in the United States
Radio stations established in 1956
1956 establishments in South Dakota